Badraq may refer to:
 Badraq-e Aneh Galdi
 Badraq-e Molla
 Badraq-e Nuri